The Stover Mill is a historic grist mill located in Erwinna, Bucks County, Pennsylvania. It was built of Pennsylvania fieldstone by Henry Stover in 1832. It is a -story, mill building with the first two floors of native stone and upper stories of brick.  The mill is unusual in that it takes its power directly from the Delaware River.

Currently, it operates as an art gallery.

It was added to the National Register of Historic Places in 1979.

References

External links
 Stover Mill Gallery - official site
 Stover Mill at HistoricMills.com
 Listing at Philadelphia Architects and Buildings

Grinding mills on the National Register of Historic Places in Pennsylvania
Industrial buildings completed in 1832
Grinding mills in Bucks County, Pennsylvania
Art museums and galleries in Pennsylvania
Tourist attractions in Bucks County, Pennsylvania
National Register of Historic Places in Bucks County, Pennsylvania